The Clemson class was a series of 156 destroyers which served with the United States Navy from after World War I through World War II.

The Clemson-class ships were commissioned by the United States Navy from 1919 to 1922, built by Newport News Shipbuilding & Dry Dock Company, New York Shipbuilding Corporation, William Cramp & Sons, Bethlehem Steel Corporation, Mare Island Naval Shipyard, Norfolk Naval Shipyard and Bath Iron Works, some quite rapidly.

Design evolution
As finally built, the Clemson class would be a fairly straightforward expansion of the Wickes-class destroyers. While the Wickes class had given good service there was a desire to build a class more tailored towards the anti-submarine role, and as such several design studies were completed, mainly about increasing the ships' range. This proposal foreshadowed the destroyer escorts of World War II.  

In addition, the tapered stern of the Wickes-class destroyers resulted in a large turning radius and a correction to this defect was also sought, although this was not corrected in the final design. In the end the General Board decided the  speed be retained so as to allow the Clemson class to be used as a fleet escort. The pressing need for destroyers overruled any change that would slow production compared to the proceeding Wickes class. Wing tanks for fuel oil were installed on either side of the ships to increase the operational range. This design choice meant the fuel oil would be stored above the waterline and create additional vulnerability, but the Navy felt a  range was worth the risk. Additional improvements included provisions for 5-inch guns to be installed at a later date, an enlarged rudder to help reduce the turn radius, and an additional  anti-aircraft gun on the after deck-house.

The class resulted from a General Board recommendation for further destroyers to combat the submarine threat, culminating in a total of 267 Wickes- and Clemson-class destroyers completed. However, the design of the ships remained optimized for operation with the battleship fleet.

Armament 

The main armament was the same as the Wickes class: four /50 caliber guns and twelve  torpedo tubes. The Mark 8 torpedo was initially equipped, and probably remained the standard torpedo for this class, as 600 Mark 8 torpedoes were issued to the British in 1940 as part of the Destroyers for Bases Agreement.

Although the design provided for two anti-aircraft (AA) guns, most ships carried a single /23 caliber AA gun, typically on the aft deckhouse. A frequent modification was replacing the aft 4-inch gun with the 3-inch gun to make more room for the depth charge tracks. Anti-submarine (ASW) armament was added during or after construction. Typically, two depth charge tracks were provided aft, along with a Y-gun depth charge projector forward of the aft deckhouse.

Despite the provision for 5-inch guns, only seven ships were built with an increased gun armament.  and  had twin 4-inch/50 mounts for a total of eight guns, while DD 231–235 had four /51 caliber guns in place of the 4-inch guns.

In operation 
As with the preceding Wickes class, the fleet found that the tapered cruiser stern, which made for a nice depth charge deployment feature, dug into the water and increased the turning radius, thus hampering anti-submarine work. While an increased rudder size helped, the answer would be in a redesigned stern, but this was not implemented. They were reported to be prone to heavy rolling in light load conditions.  The flush deck gave the hull great strength but this also made the deck very wet.

Ships in class 

156 Clemson-class destroyers were built, with an additional six cancelled.

History 

Fourteen ships of the class were involved in the Honda Point Disaster (aka Point Pedernales) in 1923, of which seven were lost.

Many never saw wartime service, as a significant number were decommissioned in 1930 and scrapped as part of the London Naval Treaty. About 40 Clemson-class destroyers with Yarrow boilers were scrapped or otherwise disposed of in 1930–31, as these boilers wore out quickly in service. Flush-deckers in reserve were commissioned as replacements. In 1936 only some 169 of the flush deck destroyers would be left, four Caldwell class and the rest Wickes and Clemson class. In 1937 four Clemson class were converted to destroyer minelayers (hull classification symbol DM), joining several Wickes-class ships in this role.

Others were upgraded or converted to high-speed transports (APD), high-speed minesweepers (DMS), destroyer minelayers (DM), or seaplane tenders (AVD) and served through World War II. Four Wickes-class DM conversions and the four Clemson-class DM conversions survived to serve in World War II.

Most ships remaining in service during World War II were rearmed with dual-purpose 3-inch/50 caliber guns to provide better anti-aircraft protection. The AVD seaplane tender conversions received two guns; the APD high-speed transport, DM minelayer, and DMS minesweeper conversions received three guns, and those retaining destroyer classification received six. Their original low-angle 4-inch/50 caliber guns (Mark 9) were transferred to Defensively Equipped Merchant Ships for anti-submarine protection. For the ships converted to minesweepers, the twelve 21-inch torpedo tubes were replaced by minesweeping gear.

 was scuttled at Soerabaja on 2 March 1942, following the surrender of the Dutch East Indies to the Japanese. She was raised, repaired and recommissioned as Japanese patrol boat PB-102 by the Imperial Japanese Navy. She was surrendered to the US Navy following the end of World War II. In addition, 17 Clemson-class destroyers were lost during the war.

A number of ships in the class were christened by the initial batch of women who enlisted in the Navy as Yeoman (F) in World War I.  The USS Hatfield (DD-231) was sponsored by Mrs. J. Edmond Haugh (Helen Brooks) who had been a Yeoman during the Great War.

See also

List of United States Navy losses in World War II
List of ship classes of the Second World War

Notes

References 
 
 
 
 Gardiner, Robert, Conway's All the World's Fighting Ships 1906-1921, London: Conway Maritime Press, 1985. .
 Gardiner, Robert and Chesneau, Roger, Conway's All the World's Fighting Ships 1922-1946, London: Conway Maritime Press, 1980. .
 Silverstone, Paul H., U.S. Warships of World War I (Ian Allan, 1970), .
 
NavSource Destroyer Photo Index Page
DiGiulian, Tony Navweaps.com 4"/50 Gun Page
DiGiulian, Tony Navweaps.com 3"/23 Gun Page
DiGiulian, Tony Navweaps.com 3"/50 Gun Page
DiGiulian, Tony Navweaps.com Pre-WWII US Torpedoes
US Navy Torpedo History, part 2

External links

 Clemson-class destroyers at Destroyer History Foundation
 Tin Can Sailors @ Destroyers.org Clemson class

Destroyer classes